Windows is a one-movement orchestral composition written by Jacob Druckman in 1972. It won the Pulitzer Prize for Music in the same year. Windows was commissioned by the Serge Koussevitzky Music Foundation for conductor Bruno Maderna and the Chicago Symphony Orchestra and is dedicated to conductor Serge Koussevitzky and his wife Natalie.

Druckman himself explained the name of the composition as follows:

Much of the work involves the use of aleatoric processes, similar to those associated with Witold Lutosławski. Windows was originally going to share a program with Claude Debussy's Jeux when it was premiered and Druckman wanted to pay homage to Debussy.

A typical performance of the piece lasts about 20 minutes.

Instrumentation 
The work is written for an orchestra with the following instrumentation.

Woodwinds
 3 flutes (3rd doubles piccolos)
 2 oboes
 1 English horn
 2 B clarinets
 1 B bass clarinet
 2 bassoons
 1 contrabassoon

Brass
 4 horns (asst. 1st and 3rd advisable)
 3 trumpets (C)
 3 trombones (3rd tenor-bass with F attachment)
 1 tuba

Other 1 harp
 1 keyboard player playing piano and electric organ

Percussion (3 players)
 1 glockenspiel
 1 vibraphone
 1 marimba
 1 steel drum
 chimes
 1 timpani
 2 bass drums
 2 conga drums
 1 snare drum
 1 pair of timbales
 2 pairs of bongos
 3 temple blocks
 2 wood blocks
 2 tam-tams
 2 gongs (mid-range, without definite pitch)
 2 large suspended cymbals
 2 small suspended cymbals
 1 large sizzle cymbal
 1 heavy spring coil with sizzles
 1 saw

Strings
 violins
 violas
 cellos
 contrabasses

References 

1972 compositions
Compositions for orchestra
Pulitzer Prize for Music-winning works
Music commissioned by Serge Koussevitzky or the Koussevitzky Music Foundation

Compositions that use extended techniques